Spheric Universe Experience is a French progressive metal band formed in 1999, which employ progressive metal with symphonic elements.

Biography
The band was formed by guitarist Vince Benaim and John Drai decided to create a progressive metal band. The band did a handful of gigs in and around the southern parts of France, under the name Gates Of Delirium. It was not until 2001 that the band added a keyboardist, Fred Colombo, and a vocalist. The band changed their name to Amnesya and played a handful of concerts and produced one demo CD.

The band split due to musical disagreements in August 2002. Benaim, Drai and Colombo continued under the name Spheric Universe Experience. The band then spent eight months writing an album, which was recorded at a home studio in April 2003 with session vocalist Franck Garcia. The vocals were recorded in a professional studio, and Garcia's performance impressed the band so much he was invited to join on a permanent basis. The 2003 demo The Burning Box was sent to Intromental Management in Denmark, who offered them a deal.

Since then the band have gone through a number of lineup changes and have in total released five studio albums.

Discography

Studio albums

Band members

Current
Fred Colombo − Keyboard
Vince Benaim - Guitar
John Drai - Bass
Frank Garcia - Vocals
Romain Goulon - Drums

Former
Samuel Boulade - Drums
Volodia Brice - Drums
Guillaume Morero - Drums
Nicolas 'Ranko' Muller - Drums
Christophe Briand - Drums
Gabriel Odvad - Drums

External links
Official website

Musical groups established in 1999
French progressive metal musical groups
French symphonic metal musical groups
1999 establishments in France